Alan Jack Barton Wright (3 March 1905 – 29 July 1989) was an English cricketer.  Wright was a right-handed batsman.  He was born at Semilong, Northamptonshire.

Wright made two first-class appearances for Northamptonshire against Yorkshire in the 1922 County Championship and Nottinghamshire in the 1923 County Championship.  In the match against Yorkshire at the County Ground, Northampton, Wright scored a single run Northamptonshire's first-innings, before being dismissed by George Macaulay.  In their second-innings he was dismissed for a duck by Wilfred Rhodes.  Yorkshire won the match by ten wickets.  In the match against Nottinghamshire at Trent Bridge, he was dismissed for a duck in Northamptonshire's first-innings by Frank Matthews, while in their second-innings he scored 3 runs, before being dismissed by the same bowler.

He died at Catford, London on 29 July 1989.  His brother, Ronald Wright, also played first-class cricket for Northamptonshire.

References

External links
Alan Wright at ESPNcricinfo
Alan Wright at CricketArchive

1905 births
1989 deaths
Cricketers from Northampton
English cricketers
Northamptonshire cricketers